Scopula microphylla is a moth of the  family Geometridae. It is found in Australia (Queensland).

Adults are pale brown with curved dark green patches.

References

Moths described in 1889
microphylla
Moths of Australia